CFHOF may refer to:

Canadian Football Hall of Fame
College Football Hall of Fame